Mário Kurali (born 17 January 1992) is a Slovak former professional ice hockey defenceman.

Career
Kurali began his career with HK Poprad, playing in their U18 and U20 teams from 2006 to 2010. He was then drafted 45th overall by the Acadie–Bathurst Titan of the Quebec Major Junior Hockey League in the 2010 CHL Import Draft. He played two seasons with the Titan with a spell with HK Orange 20 in between before returning to Poprad.

Kurali would spend the next three seasons with Poprad before joining MsHK Žilina on July 7, 2015. He returned to Poprad once more a year later before moving to Aigles de Nice in France's Ligue Magnus on December 12, 2016. On June 29, 2017, Kurali went back to Slovakia and signed for MHk 32 Liptovský Mikuláš.

On February 10, 2020, Kurali moved to HKM Zvolen for the remainder of the 2019–20 Tipsport Liga season which would eventually end prematurely due to the COVID-19 pandemic. On July 21, 2020, Kurali returned to MHk 32 Liptovský Mikuláš.

International play
Kurali played in the 2012 World Junior Ice Hockey Championships for Slovakia, playing all six games in the competition without scoring a point.

Career statistics

Regular season and playoffs

International

References

External links
 

1992 births
Living people
People from Stará Ľubovňa
Sportspeople from the Prešov Region
Slovak ice hockey defencemen
Acadie–Bathurst Titan players
HK Poprad players
MsHK Žilina players
Les Aigles de Nice players
MHk 32 Liptovský Mikuláš players
HKM Zvolen players
Slovak expatriate ice hockey players in Canada
Expatriate ice hockey players in France
Slovak expatriate sportspeople in France